Torae L. Carr (born March 18, 1977), known mononymously as Torae, is an American rapper from the Coney Island section of Brooklyn, New York. He has released a number of solo albums and collaborative works, and operates the independent record label Internal Affairs Entertainment.

Career
Torae gained recognition by collaborating with DJ Premier and Marco Polo. After releasing his debut mixtape Daily Conversation in 2008, he and Polo went on to receive critical acclaim for their collaborative LP entitled Double Barrel. In 2007, HipHopDX featured him in their DXNext underground hip hop series. In the same year, he was named Chairman's Choice in XXL. In addition to Polo and Premier, Torae has worked with producers Eric G., Black Milk, and Khrysis. Torae has collaborated frequently with fellow Brooklyn MCs Skyzoo and Sha Stimuli. He has also worked with Tash of Tha Alkaholiks, Teflon, Chaundon, Sean Price, Masta Ace, Wale, Nefew, and Talib Kweli.

He released his debut studio album, For the Record, on November 1, 2011. The album features the production from Pete Rock, Large Professor, DJ Premier, and the Grammy Award-winning 9th Wonder. The following year, he released an EP entitled Off the Record, which comprises eight songs recorded during the making of his debut album. On May 27, 2014, he and fellow Brooklyn rapper Skyzoo released their collaborative album, Barrel Brothers.

Selected discography
 2008: Daily Conversation, Album
 2009: Double Barrel, Album (with Marco Polo)
 2011: Heart Failure, EP
 2011: For the Record, Album
 2012: Off the Record, EP
 2013: Admission of Guilt, Mixtape
 2014: Barrel Brothers, Album (with Skyzoo as Barrel Brothers)
 2016: Entitled, Album
 2018: All Praises Due, Album

Complete discography
 TORAE - "Just Dat Simple" from Unsigned Artists Vol.1 (1996) UNSIGNED ARTISTS ENTERTAINMENT
 TORAE - "Party On" "Lick A Shot" from Unda' Investigation, EP (1997) AFFINITY RECORDINGS
 TORAE - "Gimme The Mic" b/w "Spice Thang", 12" single (1998) INTERNAL AFFAIRS ENTERTAINMENT
 TORAE - Coney Island's Finest, EP (2001) INTERNAL AFFAIRS ENTERTAINMENT
 The Co. {Coalescence} - "Promises" b/w "T.I.M.E.", 12" single (2006) AV8 RECORDS
 9th Wonder - "Merchant of Dreams" from The Dream Merchant Vol. 2, Album (2007) 6 HOLE RECORDS
 Born Talent - "Deep With The Lyrical" from The Essence, Album (2007) 54 SIDE RECORDS
 Dela - "Just Chill" from Atmosphere Airlines, Album (2007) DRINK WATER MUSIC
 Skyzoo & TORAE - "Get It Done" b/w "Click", 12" single (2007) FAT BEATS RECORDS
 Chaundon - "3 Kings", "Told You That" from Carnage, Album (2008) DEFEND MUSIC
 DJ K.O. - "Someday", "3 In The Chamber", "That Knack" from Picture This, Album (2008) SHAMAN WORKS
 eMC - "Backstage" from The Show, Album (2008) M3 RECORDS
 Khrome - "Grizzly" from The Beasts Released, Album (2008) GODSENDANT MUSIC
 Medinah Starr - "Beauty and Pain" from Serious Intermission, Album (2008) INTROSPECT RECORDS
 Pumpkin Head - "Hands High" from Picture That, Album (2008) SOULSPAZM RECORDS
 Shabaam Sahdeeq - "Keep Comin" from Relentless, Album (2008) MARVIAL, LLC
 Statik Selektah - "Destined To Shine" from Stick 2 The Script, Album (2008) SHOWOFF RECORDS
 Supastition - "It's All Over" from Leave Of Absence, Album (2008) DOMINATION RECORDS
 DJ JS1 - "Bang Da Underground" from No Sellout, Album (2009) GROUND ORIGINAL/FAT BEATS RECORDS
 DJ Spinna - "Lyrics Is Back" from Sonic Smash, Album (2009) HIGH WATER MUSIC
 El Da Sensei & The Returners - "Money [Part 2]" from The Money, EP (2009) COALMINE RECORDS
 Keelay & Zaire - "Saturday" from Prelude To Drive, EP (2009) MYX MUSIC LABEL
 Lee Bannon - "A New Song" from Me & Marvin, Album (2009) TOY BOX MUSIC
 Marco Polo & TORAE - Double Barrel, Album (2009) DUCK DOWN RECORDS
 Marco Polo & TORAE - "Double Barrel" b/w "Hold Up" & "Combat Drills", 12" single (2009) DUCK DOWN RECORDS/FAT BEATS
 Rapper Big Pooh - "It's A Go" from The Delightful Bars, Album (2009) HALL OF JUSTUS
 Sha Stimuli - "What's Wrong With That? (Wake Up The World)" from My Soul To Keep, Album (2009) CHAMBER MUSIK
 Shuko - "Super M.C.S." from The Foundation, Album (2009) COALMINE RECORDS
 Statik Selektah - "Destined To Shine (Obama Remix)" from Grand Theft Auto IV: The Lost & Damned (Special Edition), EP (2009) SHOWOFF RECORDS
 Beat*Society & DJ K.O. - "That Knack", "3 In The Chamber", "Someday" from Master Thieves 02: Picture These Remixes, Album (2010) SOULSPAZM RECORDS
 Cimer Amor - "Another Classic" from Another Classic, EP (2010)
 Cold Heat - "When It Rains" from Life Behind Bars (2010) GROUND ORIGINAL/SOULSPAZM RECORDS
 Steele of Smif-N-Wessun - "Amerikkka's Nightmare" from Amerikkka's Nightmare, Pt. 2 Children of War, Album (2010) DUCK DOWN RECORDS
 Little Brother - "24" from Left Back, Album (2010) HALL OF JUSTUS
 M7 - "U Gotta Love It" from NYC The 5 Boroughs, Album (2010) M7 RECORDS
 Marco Polo - "Combat Drills", "Exile Radio Remix" from The Stupendous Adventures of Marco Polo, Album (2010) DUCK DOWN RECORDS
 Statik Selektah - "Get Out" from 100 Proof: The Hangover, Album (2010) SHOWOFF RECORDS
 M-Dot & DJ Jean Maron - "Be Easy" from Run MPC, Album (2010) SOULSPAZM/EMS PRODUCTIONS
 TORAE - Heart Failure, EP (2011) INTERNAL AFFAIRS ENTERTAINMENT/SOULSPAZM
 TORAE - For the Record, Album (2011) INTERNAL AFFAIRS ENTERTAINMENT
 TORAE - Off the Record, EP (2012) INTERNAL AFFAIRS ENTERTAINMENT/SOULSPAZM
 TORAE - Black Christmas, EP (2012) INTERNAL AFFAIRS ENTERTAINMENT
 Barrel Brothers (Skyzoo & TORAE) - Barrel Brothers (2014) First Generation Rich, INC./INTERNAL AFFAIRS ENT.

Mixtapes
 TORAE - Make Room At The Top (2003) INTERNAL AFFAIRS ENTERTAINMENT
 DJ Vega Benetton - "Freestyle" from Streets of New York (2004)
 Skyzoo - "Blackout" from The City's Favorite (2005)
 Marco Polo & Mick Boogie - "Casualty", "Good God" from Newport Authority (2007)
 Skyzoo - "Get It Done", "Click", "They Don't Want It" from Corner Store Classic (2007)
 Legend, DJ Nice & Statik Selektah - "Intro" from Back To Basics (2008)
 Mick Boogie - "Hand On The Pump" from Mick Boogie Presents – The Honor Roll (2008)
 Sha Stimuli & DJ Victorious - "Bentley" from The Secret (2008)
 Sha Stimuli & DJ Victorious - "Coulda Been Me" from Sha Stimuli & DJ Victorious Presents March On Washington (2008)
 Tanya Morgan - "Shake It Off" from Tanya Morgan Is A Rap Group (2008)
 TORAE - Daily Conversation (2008) INTERNAL AFFAIRS ENT./FAT BEATS
 TORAE - Allow Me To Reintroduce Myself (2008) INTERNAL AFFAIRS ENTERTAINMENT
 DJ Concept, Marco Polo & TORAE - Armed & Dangerous (2009)
 Cambatta - "Smooth Flight" from The Visionary (2009)
 DJ Concept Presents Skyzoo, Chaundon, & TORAE - Three Kings (2009)
 DJ Critical Hype - "Intro", "Wack DJ's", "Outro" from DJ Critical Hype presents Marco Polo Blends (2009)
 Lee Bannon - "A New Song" from Me & Marvin (2009)
 Mr. Mecca - "Over Here" from The Cover Run (2009)
 Sean Price - "Duck Down" from Kimbo Price (2009) DUCK DOWN RECORDS
 Various Artists - "Smoke", "Get It Done", "Duck Down" from Duck Down Records Presents Download The Right Thing (2009)
 Various Artists - "Pardon Me" from Illroots.com & Subconscious Threads Present – Spring Cleaning (2009)
 DJ Quiz - "Freestyle" from Quiz Knows (2010)
 Mick Boogie/NVME & Duck Down Records - "Talk Shit" from Survival Kit (2010)
 Reks - "Rapanomics" from Between The Lines (2010)
 Wale & 9th Wonder - "Sharp" from Back To The Feature (2010) 9TH WONDER PRESENTS
 TORAE - Heart Failure (2011) INTERNAL AFFAIRS ENT.
 E Holla & TORAE - Allow Me To Reintroduce Myself 2 (2012) INTERNAL AFFAIRS ENT.
 TORAE - Admission of Guilt (2013) INTERNAL AFFAIRS ENT.

References

 http://www.hiphopdx.com/index/dxnext/id.14/title.torae
 https://web.archive.org/web/20090413000354/http://www.xxlmag.com/online/?p=10865
 https://web.archive.org/web/20100402000908/http://www.xxlmag.com/online/?p=47616
 http://hiphopgame.ihiphop.com/index2.php3?page=toraepolo
 http://hiphopgame.ihiphop.com/index2.php3?page=torae
 https://web.archive.org/web/20110811040150/http://admin.allhiphop.com/stories/breedingground/archive/2008/02/21/19323842.aspx
 http://stage.allhiphop.com/stories/features/archive/2009/10/13/21975599.aspx
 https://web.archive.org/web/20110707124726/http://www.amalgamdigital.com/blog/new-interview-w-torae/2009/04/29/
 https://web.archive.org/web/20101205193013/http://www.amalgamdigital.com/blog/a-couple-rounds-of-double-barrel/2009/06/15/
 https://web.archive.org/web/20101205193706/http://www.amalgamdigital.com/blog/grimy-fingernail-timbs-music/2009/04/29/
 http://www.brooklynbodega.com/2010/05/13/bhf-alumni-marco-polo-torae-interview/
 http://www.mtvu.com/music/hot-seat/marco-polo-torae/

African-American male rappers
Living people
Musicians from Brooklyn
Rappers from New York City
21st-century American rappers
21st-century American male musicians
21st-century African-American musicians
1977 births